Sigvald may refer to:

Sigvald Asbjørnsen (1867–1954), Norwegian born American sculptor
Sigvald Oppebøen Hansen (born 1950), Norwegian politician for the Labour Party
Sigvald Hasund (1868–1959), Norwegian researcher of agriculture and politician for the Liberal Party
Sigvald Jarl, son of Strut-Harald the Jarl of Skåne and the brother of Thorkell the Tall (Torkjell Høge)
Sigvald Johannesson (1877–1953), Danish-American civil engineer known for his design of the Pulaski Skyway
Holm Sigvald Morgenlien (1909–1995), Norwegian politician for the Labour Party
Oscar Sigvald Julius Strugstad (1851–1919), Norwegian military officer and politician
Oscar Sigvald Strugstad (1887–1953), Norwegian military officer
Sigvald Svendsen (1895–1956), Norwegian politician for the Liberal Party

See also 
 Sigvalue

Danish masculine given names
Norwegian masculine given names